Psoy Galaktionovich Korolenko (born April 26, 1967) is a pseudonym of a Russian songwriter and performer by the name of Pavel Eduardovich Lion. Pavel Lion is also a slavist with a Ph.D. in Russian literature.

Musical career 
His pseudonym comes from Vladimir Korolenko, Russian writer (1853–1921), whose works are subject of Pavel's research. In university, Korolenko studied under Russian literature historian , among others.

Psoy performs his own and others' songs, accompanying himself to keyboard instruments, mainly a Casio synthesizer in accordion timbre. Experimenting with quite various song traditions he sings in about six or seven languages, most frequently in Russian, Yiddish, English and French.

For example, one of Psoy's songs, Buratino, is an a capella rhythmic recitation of the same phrase – "Buratino byl tupoy" ("Buratino was dumb") – which after several repetitions starts to morph into other phrases, eventually shifting into Italian through syllable rearrangement. More phrases are then introduced and "mixed" vocally with it. The song is something of a parody of rap and trance music.

Psoy tours extensively beyond Russian borders, particularly in the United States, Europe and Israel. His music is popular both with adults (especially linguists) and teenagers. He rewrites many songs, and also has translated some songs from Russian to Yiddish. He has collaborated with musicians such as Julian Kytasty, Michael Alpert, and Daniel Kahn & The Painted Bird.

Discography 

 Yiddish Glory, various artists, Six Degrees Records, 2018, nominated for the Grammy

See also 
 List of multilingual bands and artists

References 

 Psoy's bio
 Rokhl Kafrissen. Psoy Korolenko's 21st Century Humor. The Forward, February 28, 2012.

External links 
 
 Official website of the Dust film

1967 births
Living people
Russian male film actors
Russian satirists
21st-century Russian male singers
21st-century Russian singers
Converts to Eastern Orthodoxy from Judaism
Jewish Russian actors